Otitoma batjanensis is a species of sea snail, a marine gastropod mollusk in the family Pseudomelatomidae, the turrids and allies.

Description
The height of the shell attains 7.5 mm, its width 3 mm.

(Original description) The strong, whitish shell has a fusiform shape. It contains six whorls, of which three form a large, convexly-whorled, smooth and shining protoconch. The whorls of the teleoconch are moderately convex, slightly concave below a strong, yellowish, subsutural spiral. The sculpture consists of this spiral and some other ones, 7in number on penultimate, 22 and a few intermediate ones on last whorl, stronger on lower part of upper whorls and on median part of last one. The spirals are crossed by conspicuous growth-striae, stronger in the interstices, which are broader near the base. The aperture is oval and angular above. The peristome is strong, with a rather wide, deep sinus above, protracted lower on, bordered exteriorly by a strong, rounded rib. The columellar margin is slightly concave above, nearly straight below, with a strong layer of enamel, forming a wall at its upper extremity, bordering the sinus. The siphonal canal is rather wide, slightly directed to the left. The interior of the aperture is smooth and white.

Distribution
This marine species occurs off Sulawesi, Indonesia.

References

External links
 
  Bouchet P., Kantor Yu.I., Sysoev A. & Puillandre N. (2011) A new operational classification of the Conoidea. Journal of Molluscan Studies 77: 273–308

batjanensis
Gastropods described in 1913